Hyperstoma is a genus of firefly beetles in the family Lampyridae. Previously considered as a monotypic genus, the second species of the genus was described from 2011. The genus is endemic to Sri Lanka.

Taxonomy
The genus is closely related to the genera Lamellipalpus and Lamellipalpodes due to having fused terminal and penultimate terga.

Description
Body length is about 5 to 5.5 mm. Body is oval, with ranges from yellow to light brown in color. The terminal maxillary and labial palpomere are extremely long. Males possess flabellate antennae with stout branches attached to the apex of antennomere. The terminal and penultimate abdominal terga of the male is also fused, and jointly trilobed. The distal portion of the antennae and elytral margins are dark brown. Eyes are small. Antennae consists with 11 segments, where 3 to 10 antennomeres are flabellate with strongly flattened lamellae. Mandibles are small, hooked, and apically pointed. Maxillary palpi with 4 segments, whereas labial palpi with 3 segments. Pronotum yellowish to light brown in color with almost straight anterior margin, rounded anterior angles, and triangular posterior angles. Scutellum triangular, and color ranges from yellow to light brown. Elytra elongate, with wide medially, with rounded apex. Elytra shiny, and irregularly densely punctured. Male genitalia possess a V-shaped phallobase, robust paramerae with rounded apex. Phallus cochleariform.

Species
 Hyperstoma marginatum Wittmer, 1979
 Hyperstoma wittmeri Janisova and Bocakova, 2011

References

Lampyridae